Salacgrīva parish is an administrative unit of Limbaži Municipality in the Vidzeme region of Latvia. It was created in 2010 from the countryside territory of Salacgrīva town. At the beginning of 2014, the population of the parish was 2275.

Towns, villages and settlements of Salacgrīva parish 
 Salacgrīva – parish administrative center

References

External links

Parishes of Latvia
Limbaži Municipality
Vidzeme